Sperantza Vrana (6 February 1928 – 29 September 2009) was a Greek actress and writer.

She was born as Elpida Homatianou (Ελπίδα Χωματιανού) in Messolongi on 6 February, either in 1926 or 1932. She wrote several books, with the most famous of them being her autobiography Tolmo (Τολμώ, I Dare). Sperantza Vrana died of a heart attack on 29 September 2009, aged 81.

Filmography

Film

Notes

References

External links 
 

2009 deaths
Greek stage actresses
Greek film actresses
People from Missolonghi
1928 births